Blake Frischknecht (born May 10, 1995) is an American professional soccer player who currently plays for Chattanooga Red Wolves SC in USL League One.

Career

College & Amateur 
Frischknecht began playing college soccer at Brigham Young University, before taking a two-year hiatus from soccer to complete a mission for the Church of Jesus Christ of Latter-day Saints in Bahia Blanca, Argentina. Upon his return to the United States, Frischknecht transferred to Utah Valley University, where he played for three seasons, scoring 20 goals and tallying 2 assists in 54 appearances for the Wolverines.

Whilst at college, Frischknecht appeared in the USL PDL for his college team, BYU Cougars during and after his years of enrollment at the college. He also played with Ogden City SC in 2018 and 2019. Following his time with Ogden City in the PDL, he went to play with NPSL side Orange County FC. Frischknecht made headlines in May 2019 when his 89th minute goal gave OCFC the lead over Las Vegas Lights FC in the Third Round of the 2019 U.S. Open Cup. The win made history for Orange County, which became the first NPSL side to ever beat two professional teams in a single U.S. Open Cup tournament.

Professional 
On August 13, 2020, Frischknecht signed with local USL Championship side Las Vegas Lights. He made his professional debut on August 15, 2020, appearing as a 78th-minute substitute during a 1–0 loss to Orange County SC.

On April 7, 2021, Frischknecht joined USL League One side Chattanooga Red Wolves SC ahead of the 2021 season.

Personal life
While at BYU Frischknecht appeared with other members of his team in the Studio C viral video "Top Soccer Shootout Ever With Scott Sterling". In the fictional Penalty shoot-out between Yale and North Carolina he plays the roll of Tarheels' player "Lambert".

Career Statistics

References

External links 
 
 Utah Valley profile

1995 births
Living people
American soccer players
Association football forwards
BYU Cougars men's soccer players
Utah Valley Wolverines men's soccer players
Ogden City SC players
Las Vegas Lights FC players
Chattanooga Red Wolves SC players
Soccer players from Nevada
Sportspeople from Las Vegas
National Premier Soccer League players
USL Championship players
USL League Two players